Brett Dobson (Born April 3rd, 2000) is a Canadian lacrosse goalie for the Archers Lacrosse Club of the Premier Lacrosse League, and as well for the Georgia Swarm of the National Lacrosse League. He is also a member of the Canada men's national lacrosse team. He represented Team Canada at the 2022 World Games Championship in Birmingham, Alabama, winning the gold medal.

Early Life and Career 
Dobson is the son of Heather and Richard Dobson and has a younger sister, Kylea who plays lacrosse at The University of Louisville. Dobson attended The Hill Academy for 3 Seasons as well as playing Junior A Lacrosse for the Whitby Warriors, where he would spend 5 seasons. Dobson was only able to compete in 4 seasons due to the COVID 19 Pandemic.

Collegiate Career 
Dobson arrived on the campus of St. Bonaventure University in the fall of 2018, as the first recruit in program history with Inside Lacrosse ranking him the 12th goalie in his class.  With the program beginning from scratch, Dobson was able to start all 4 years and leave his mark on the program, holding school records for the Most Saves in A Single Season (252 Saves), Highest Save Percentage in A Single Season (66.5%), and Most Saves in A Single Game (27) to name a few. In his senior year, Dobson was the 2022 MAAC Defensive Player of The Year, 2nd Team All American by Inside Lacrosse & USA Lacrosse Magazine, 3rd Team All American per USILA, Was named to the Tewaaraton Award Watch List, and led the entire Nation in Save Percentage. With the COVID-19 Pandemic hitting in 2020, all spring athletes were granted an extra year of eligibility. Following Dobson's Senior Season, he decided to forgo his 5th year of eligibility and entire his name into the 2022 PLL Draft.

PLL Career 
Dobson, was selected 12th overall to the Archers Lacrosse Club in the 2022 PLL Entry Draft, where he was the first goalie taken off the board, becoming the first ever St. Bonaventure player to be selected in a professional lacrosse draft. In his first season with the Archers, he started one game against the number 1 seeded Whipsnakes where he posted a 52% Save Percentage, Collecting 14 saves and giving up 13 goals in a losing effort in his first professional start in the PLL.

NLL Career 
Dobson was selected 11th Overall to the Georgia Swarm in the 2022 NLL Entry Draft, where he was the first goalie taken off the board. In his rookie season so far, he's yet to see a start in the National Lacrosse League but has seen 6:18 of action closing out the final minutes in a game against the Philadelphia Wings giving up 1 goal in his brief relief stint.

Statistics

NCAA

PLL

International Career 
Dobson made his international debut at the 2022 World Games, helping Canada win the gold medal. He will be making his return to Team Canada in 2023 when he suits up in the World Lacrosse Championship in San Diego, California.

References

2000 births
Living people
Canadian lacrosse players
Georgia Swarm players
Lacrosse people from Ontario
Premier Lacrosse League players
St. Bonaventure Bonnies athletes
Competitors at the 2022 World Games
World Games gold medalists